The HoPWF Cruiserweight Championship is the top professional wrestling Cruiserweight title in the House of Pain Wrestling Federation promotion. It was created on December 23, 1997, when The Perfect Champion defeated Fumar in Hagerstown, Maryland. The title is defended primarily in the Mid-Atlantic and East Coast, most often in Maryland, but also Pennsylvania and West Virginia. There are 29 recognized known champions with a total of 54 title reigns.

Title history

References

Cruiserweight wrestling championships